Antiochus, or Antioch or Andéol, was the metropolitan Bishop of Lyon. He died about 410.

He is venerated as a saint in the Catholic Church, with his feast day being 13 August.

Biography
Antiochus was a priest in Lyon, when his bishop Justus of Lyon resigned his see and moved to the Scetic Desert in Egypt to live in a Skete, Antiochus had the desire to see the holy prelate. He therefore embarked at Marseilles for Egypt and came to the saint to induce him to return. Justus declined and Antiochus returned to Gaul.

Antioch later became bishop in Lyon during the early 5th century and he arranged to bring the relics of Bishop Justus to Lyon and buried them in the Basilica of the Maccabees, where he himself was later buried.

References

Bishops of Lyon
5th-century bishops in Gaul
Year of birth unknown
Year of death uncertain